The Essential Judas Priest is a 2006 two-disc compilation album by English heavy metal band Judas Priest. It contains 34 songs from throughout their career right up to their then-most recent album Angel of Retribution, but excludes the Tim "Ripper" Owens era and material from their debut album Rocka Rolla. It was re-released in 2008 as a limited-edition 3-disc package.
It was re-released again in 2010 as a Blu-spec CD. This version has a slightly different track list on the first disc; "Nostradamus" from the 2008 album of that name replaces "Victim of Changes" as the fifth track.

Track listing

Personnel
 Rob Halford: Vocals.
 Glenn Tipton: Guitars.
 K.K. Downing: Guitars.
 Ian Hill: Bass guitars.
 Scott Travis: Drums (1, 12, 16 Disc 1; 8, 13, 17 Disc 2).

Other personnel
  Dave Holland: Drums (2, 6, 7, 8, 10, 11, 14, 15, 17 Disc 1; 1, 2, 3, 4, 7, 10, 11, 15, 16 Disc 2).
 Les Binks: Drums (3, 9, 13 Disc 1; 5, 6, 12 Disc 2).
 Simon Phillips: Drums (4 Disc 1; 9 Disc 2).
 Alan Moore: Drums (5 Disc 1; 14 Disc 2).
 Don Airey (session musician): Keyboards (12 Disc 1).

Charts

References

Judas Priest compilation albums
2006 greatest hits albums